Southern Lights is a novel by Danielle Steel, published by Delacorte Press in October 2009. The book is Steel's seventy-ninth novel.

Synopsis
Alexa Hamilton left the South behind after her husband's betrayal and his family's cruelty. As an assistant D.A. in Manhattan, Alexa is a top prosecutor and a single mother to a teenage daughter. But when her latest case brings threatening letters to her seventeen-year-old daughter, Savannah, Alexa is certain that her client, Luke Quentin is behind it. Making the most painful decision of her life she sends her daughter back to her southern roots to protect her from harm.

Savannah settles into the southern life, enjoying her father and family again as her mother battles in Manhattan. Alexa and Savannah come to heal old wounds and find love again under the southern lights.

References

External links
http://www.randomhouse.com/features/steel/bookshelf/display.pperl?isbn=9780385340281

2009 American novels
American romance novels
Novels by Danielle Steel
Delacorte Press books